Indian Captive: The Story of Mary Jemison is a children's biographical novel written and illustrated by Lois Lenski. The book was first published in 1941 and was a Newbery Honor recipient in 1942.
Indian Captive is a historical fiction book retelling the life of Mary Jemison, with a few minor twists. The story is very similar to Mary Jemison's true life.

Plot summary
Twelve-year-old Mary Jemison took her peaceful days on her family's farm in eastern Pennsylvania for granted. But on a spring day in 1758, something happened that changed her life forever. A band of warriors invaded the house and took the Jemison family captive. Mary was separated from her parents and brothers and sister. Before she was given an Indian name, she traveled with the Indians to southern Ohio and later to a Seneca village on the Genesee River in what is now western New York.

Mary's new life was not easy. She misses her family terribly, and she was unaccustomed to Seneca ways. Several times she even tried to run away. But the Indians were kind to her and taught her many things about the earth, its plants, and its creatures. They named her "Corn Tassel" after the tassels of corn when she first arrived in the village in southern Ohio, one of her favorite things. She became a sister to animals and to all growing things. Corn Tassel made some Indian friends such as Shining Star, one of the two sisters who brought her to their old Indian Village: Seneca Town before they went to Genesee Town by the Falling Waters; Little Turtle/Turkey Feather, an Indian boy who taught Mary how to speak the Indian language; Earth Woman, an Indian woman who not only took care of her since she arrived in Genesee Town, but also taught her how to make a pot out of clay; and Beaver Girl, an Indian girl the same age and size as Corn Tassel and wanted to be her friend. Mary grew close to Shining Star, Blue Jay/Blue Trout (Shining Star's baby son) who Mary took care of since adopted into the Seneca, Earth Woman, Little Turtle/Turkey Feather, and Beaver Girl as the story progressed on. An old trader came and delivered the news of the death of her family, they were tomahawked to death by the Indians shortly after she was separated from them. Then Mary was finally given the chance to return to the world of white men. But she had also become a sister to the Indians. How could she leave them? And besides, there was no place to go now. Her family was dead, as were her beloved neighbors. She decides that she will stay with her new, Seneca family.

The Chief of the Genesee Town changed Mary's name from Corn Tassel to Little-Woman-of-Great-Courage, in honor of her courage to stay with the Indians instead of going to stay with white people, like her.

Some people have different opinions on who their favorite character is. But a lot say that the friendship Corn Tassel had with Little Turtle/Turkey Feather and Beaver Girl was a great distraction from her sorrow. In chapter 13, a new white captive, Running Dear, was given an opportunity to return to the white people. And he did. At the same time, Corn Tassel went with the women and girls to a sugar camp to make sugar from maple sap boiled down. When Corn Tassel is scolded by Panther Woman after falling onto the ground after she stumbled over a loose branch from a wood pile, she decides to find her way back to the village alone. She dropped her yoke and sap pails and started running into the forest. Beaver Girl saw this and ran after Corn Tassel. The white girl looked back over her shoulder to see Beaver Girl behind her and ran faster. But Beaver Girl got closer and closer to the white girl, no matter how fast she ran. Out of breath and tired, Corn Tassel sank to the ground in exhaustion. The next moment, Beaver Girl's arms were around her.

"Do not go, Corn Tassel," begged Beaver Girl. "If you go back to the white people, I shall never be happy again. I will have no one to talk to, no one to work with, no friend to love. Stay with me, Corn Tassel and be my friend."

Corn Tassel was touched by Beaver Girl's friendship towards her and began crying. Beaver Girl wiped the tears away and helped Corn Tassel to her feet. The two girls went back to the sugar camp to help finish the sugar making. After finishing, they returned to the village. The next day, Earth Woman announced that Running Dear went back to the pale-faces (what the Indians call the white people). After Corn Tassel asked what they can do, she received no answer. Every Indian looked at her with disapproval in their eyes. Shining Star stared coldly, and so did Turkey Feather and even Beaver Girl - all of Corn Tassel's friends. The white girl soon tried to run away again herself, but ended up hurting herself and returned to Earth Woman's lodge. Shagbark, an old Indian, told them that he knew they had to let Running Dear go. So he made it as easy for him as he could by giving him a canoe. Both Earth Woman and Corn Tassel were relieved, despite knowing they'd never see Running Dear again. That ended chapter 13.

References

1941 American novels
Children's historical novels
American children's novels
Biographical novels
Newbery Honor-winning works
Fiction set in 1758
Novels set in the 1750s
J. B. Lippincott & Co. books
1941 children's books